Atha Tehon Thiras (January 20, 1926 – February 15, 2012), professionally credited as Atha Tehon, was the daughter and second child of Dr. Leo Roy Tehon and Mrs. Leo Tehon, of Illinois.

Tehon was a student at the Jerry Farnsworth School in North Truro in the summers of 1947 and 1948, and graduated with an MFA from the University of Pennsylvania School of Design in 1949.

Work
Tehon served as the art director at Dial Books for Young Readers for 32 years, retiring in 2001. A number of the books she worked on received Caldecott medals and honors including: Why Mosquitoes Buzz in People's Ears, Ashanti to Zulu, Moja Means One, and Jambo Means Hello. She also worked as a freelance designer for Farrar, Straus and Giroux.

References

External links
 AIGA Design Archives: Atha Tehon credits
 'Caldecott Winners' on WorldCat.org

1926 births
2012 deaths
AIGA medalists
American graphic designers
American women artists
American typographers and type designers
University of Pennsylvania School of Design alumni
Women graphic designers
21st-century American women
American women graphic designers